24th parallel may refer to:

24th parallel north, a circle of latitude in the Northern Hemisphere
24th parallel south, a circle of latitude in the Southern Hemisphere